Robert, Count of Mortain, 2nd Earl of Cornwall (–) was a Norman nobleman and the half-brother (on their mother's side) of King William the Conqueror. He was one of the very few proven companions of William the Conqueror at the Battle of Hastings and as recorded in the Domesday Book of 1086 was one of the greatest landholders in his half-brother's new Kingdom of England.

Life
Robert was the son of Herluin de Conteville and Herleva of Falaise and brother of Odo of Bayeux. Robert was born  in Normandy, a half-brother of William the Conqueror. and was probably not more than a year or so younger than his brother Odo, born . About 1035, Herluin, as Vicomte of Conteville, along with his wife Herleva and Robert, founded Grestain Abbey.

Count of Mortain
Around 1049 his brother Duke William made him Count of Mortain, in place of William Werlenc, who had been banished by Duke William; according to Orderic Vitalis, on a single word. William Werlenc was a grandson of Duke Richard I  and therefore a cousin once removed to William, Duke of Normandy. Securing the southern border of Normandy was critical to Duke William and Robert was entrusted with this key county which guarded the borders of Brittany and Bellême.

Conquest of England
In early 1066, Robert was present at both the first Council of Lillebonne, that of William's inner circle, and the second larger council held to discuss the Duke's planned conquest of England. Robert agreed to provide 120 ships to the invasion fleet, which was more than any other of William's magnates. Robert was one of those few known to have been at the Battle of Hastings in 1066. He is pictured at a dinner at Pevensey on the Bayeux Tapestry, seated with his brothers William and Odo on the day of the landing in England. When granting the monastery of St Michael's Mount in Cornwall to the Norman monastery on the Mont-Saint-Michel in Normandy, Robert recorded that he had fought at the Battle of Hastings under the banner of St Michael (habens in bello Sancti Michaelis vexillum).<ref>The Cartulary of St. Michael's Mount, ed. P.L. Hull, Devon and Cornwall Record Society, New Series, Vol. V (1962), p. 1</ref>

Lands granted by William the Conqueror
Robert's contribution to the success of the invasion was clearly regarded as highly significant by the Conqueror, who awarded him a large share of the spoils; in total 797 manors at the time of Domesday. The greatest concentration of his honours lay in Cornwall where he held virtually all of that county and was considered by some the Earl of Cornwall. While Robert held lands in twenty counties, the majority of his holdings in certain counties was as few as five manors. The overall worth of his estates was £2100. He administered most of his southwestern holdings from Launceston, Cornwall, and Montacute in Somerset. The holding of single greatest importance was the rape of Pevensey (east Sussex) which protected one of the more vulnerable parts of the south coast of England.

Later life
In 1069, together with Robert of Eu, he led an army against a force of Danes in Lindsey and effected great slaughter against them. After that there is little mention of Robert who appears to have been an absentee landholder spending the majority of his time in Normandy. Along with his brother Odo he participated in a revolt in 1088 against William II but afterwards he was pardoned. Robert died in 1095, possibly on 9 December, and chose to be buried at the Abbey of Grestain, near his father and next to his first wife Matilda.

Character
He was described by William of Malmesbury in his Gesta Regum Anglorum as a man of stupid dull disposition (crassi et hebetis ingenii). William the Conqueror considered him one of his greatest supporters and trusted him with the important county of Mortain. Further clues to his character are found in the Vita of Vitalis of Savigny, a very wise monk whom Robert sought out as his chaplain. One incident tells of Robert beating his wife and Vital, intervening, threatened to end the marriage if Robert did not repent. In still another entry Vital tells of his leaving Robert's service abruptly and after being escorted back to him, Robert begged for Vital's pardon for his actions. Overall, Robert was proficient in every duty William assigned him. He was a religious man yet ill-tempered enough to beat his wife, but was not known as a man of great wisdom.

Family
Robert was married to Matilda, daughter of Roger de Montgomery, 1st Earl of Shrewsbury, before 1066 and together they had:

 William, Count of Mortain, who succeeded him, was offered to wed Mary of Scotland.
 Agnes who married André de Vitré, seigneur of Vitré.
 Denise, married in 1078 to Guy, 3rd Sire de La Val.
 Emma of Mortain, married to William IV of Toulouse, Duke of Narbonne.

Through Emma's daughter Philippa, Countess of Toulouse, Robert was the great-great-grandfather of Eleanor of Aquitaine and hence an ancestor of all English monarchs after Henry II.

After Matilda de Montgomery's death in 1084 Robert secondly married Almodis. The couple had no children.

Portrayals on screen
On screen, Robert has been portrayed by Gordon Whiting in the two-part BBC TV play Conquest (1966), part of the series Theatre 625, and by Richard Ireson in the TV drama Blood Royal: William the Conqueror'' (1990).

Notes

References

1030s births
1090s deaths
11th-century English nobility
Anglo-Normans
Companions of William the Conqueror
Norman warriors
Prisoners in the Tower of London
Devon Domesday Book tenants-in-chief